Sara Karlsson (born 1985) is a Swedish politician. She served as member of the Riksdag from 4 October 2010 to 14 May 2018, representing the constituency of Södermanland County.

References 

Living people
1985 births
Place of birth missing (living people)
21st-century Swedish politicians
21st-century Swedish women politicians
Members of the Riksdag 2010–2014
Members of the Riksdag 2014–2018
Members of the Riksdag from the Social Democrats
Women members of the Riksdag